Water-purslane or water purslane is a common name for several plants and may refer to:

Ludwigia palustris, native range includes North America
Lythrum portula, native to Europe and known as "water-purslane" in the British Isles